Louis Pierna (16 January 1933 – 28 April 2021) was a French politician. He served as mayor of Stains from 1977 to 1996, and as a Deputy from 1988 to 1997.

References

1933 births
2021 deaths
French politicians
Deputies of the 9th National Assembly of the French Fifth Republic
Deputies of the 10th National Assembly of the French Fifth Republic
Mayors of places in Île-de-France
French Communist Party politicians
Chevaliers of the Légion d'honneur
People from Seine-Saint-Denis
Members of Parliament for Seine-Saint-Denis